AALC may refer to:

 American Association of Lutheran Churches, a Lutheran denomination
 Asociación Atlética Luján de Cuyo, a football club from Luján de Cuyo in Mendoza, Argentina
 AALC, ATM Adaptation Layer Connection
 Ann Arbor Learning Community, a public charter school in Ann Arbor, Michigan
 Australian Army Legal Corps